"That Don't Impress Me Much" is a song co-written and recorded by Canadian singer Shania Twain. It was released in December 1998 as the sixth country single, and seventh single overall, from her third studio album, Come On Over (1997). It was third to pop and fourth to international markets. The song was written by Robert John "Mutt" Lange and Twain, and was originally released to North American country radio stations in late 1998. It became her third biggest single on the Billboard Hot 100 and remains one of Twain's biggest hits worldwide. "That Don't Impress Me Much" has appeared in all of Twain's tours (Come On Over, Up!, Rock This Country and Now). The country version was performed on the Come on Over Tour and the dance version on the Up! Tour. "That Don't Impress Me Much" was named Foreign Hit of the Year at the 2000 Danish Grammy Awards. A dance-pop remix of the song was used as the official song of the 2003 CONCACAF Gold Cup.

Background
Twain wrote the song on or near Christmas Day. In 2017, during a listening party for her fifth studio album Now, Twain revealed the reason behind using Brad Pitt's name instead of other suitable male celebrities saying that after she heard about the scandal between Pitt and Gwyneth Paltrow and the subsequent leaking of Pitt's naked photo in Playgirl magazine, she was left unimpressed by all the fuss as she found it was normal to see naked people.

Content
The song describes three self-absorbed suitors with whom Twain, as the title implies, is not impressed: a know-it-all ("Okay, so you're a rocket scientist"), a man obsessed with his looks ("Okay, so you're Brad Pitt"), and another obsessed with his car ("Okay, so you've got a car"). Twain states that brains, looks, and the car "won't keep [her] warm in the middle of the night" and seeks a man with "the touch" that can do so.

Critical reception
After the single's 1998 country release, Billboard magazine wrote that "it doesn't sound remotely country" and criticized the simplistic lyrics, but praised the melody's "quirky appeal, Twain's delivery," and Robert John "Mutt" Lange's "skillful production."  After the single's 1999 pop release, in a separate review, the magazine said that the single "could possibly solidify Twain's status as the decade's crossover queen," though they criticized Lange's use of "dated-sounding instrumental elements to 'pop' it up."

Music video
The music video for "That Don't Impress Me Much" was shot in the Mojave Desert at El Mirage Dry Lake and Barstow, California. It was directed by Paul Boyd and shot on November 3 and 4, 1998; it was released on December 2, 1998, on CMT. It depicts Twain hitchhiking in the middle of the desert, in a hooded leopard skin outfit (though in some scenes the hooded outfit is open, showing a matching bra) and matching stiletto-heeled boots, and being approached by several men offering her a ride out of the desert. These include a man in a 1957 Chevy Bel Air, on a motorcycle, in an army jeep, a tanker truck, and on a Friesian horse. One of the men was played by male model John Devoe, previously appeared in her "You're Still the One" video. The video won the Video of the Year award at the Canadian Country Music Awards and the MuchMoreMusic Award at the 1999 MuchMusic Video Awards. Two versions of the video were made, one with the 'Original Album Version', released to country channels, and the 'Dance Mix Edit' released to pop stations. The 'Original Album Version' of the video is available on Twain's compilations Come On Over: Video Collection (1999) and The Platinum Collection (2001). It ranked number 77 on VH1's 100 Greatest Videos in Rock and Roll in 2001 and number 45 on CMT's 100 Greatest Videos in Country Music in 2004, making it the only video to make both lists. It was also named country music's sexiest video in 2006 by CMT Canada. Twain wore a similar leopard skin outfit in a 2020 video for her Orville Peck duet "Legends Never Die".

Chart performance
"That Don't Impress Me Much" debuted at number 60 on the Billboard Hot Country Singles & Tracks chart the week of December 12, 1998, the highest debut of the week. The single spent 20 weeks on the chart and climbed to a peak position of number eight on February 27, 1999, where it remained for one week. The single became Twain's tenth Top 10 (sixth consecutive), and her 12th Top 20 single on the country charts. "That Don't Impress Me Much" also topped the Country Singles Sales chart for five weeks.

At adult contemporary radio, "That Don't Impress Me Much" debuted at number 22 the week of April 17, 1999, the week's highest debut, as well as Twain's highest debut of all time on the AC chart. The single spent 26 weeks on the chart and quickly climbed to a peak position of number eight on June 5, 1999, where it remained for one week. "That Don't Impress Me Much" became Twain's third consecutive Top 10 single on that chart.

"That Don't Impress Me Much" was also Twain's third-most successful single on the Billboard Hot 100, after "You're Still the One" and "From This Moment On", which peaked at number two and number four, respectively. The song debuted at number 80 on January 23, 1999. It spent 28 weeks on the chart and peaked at number seven for two weeks starting June 12, 1999, becoming Twain's third and last top 10 hit. It also reached number five in airplay and number 11 in sales.

Internationally, "That Don't Impress Me Much" became Twain's biggest single in the United Kingdom. It debuted, at its peak, on May 22, 1999, at number three, where it remained for three weeks, and remained in the Top 10 for another seven weeks. It remained on the entire chart for 21 weeks. "That Don't Impress Me Much" became Twain's third (second consecutive) Top 10 in the United Kingdom and the best selling non-number one single of the year in the country. Elsewhere, the song hit number one in Belgium, Ireland, Norway and New Zealand, where it debuted at number one and was later certified gold.

In all, "That Don't Impress Me Much" hit the Top 10 in 16 different countries: Australia, Austria, Belgium, Canada, Finland, Germany, Hungary, Ireland, Latvia, Netherlands, New Zealand, Norway, Scotland, Sweden, Switzerland, the United Kingdom, and the United States. In Australia, the song debuted at number five, reaching number two during its third week in, and stayed there for seven weeks as Britney Spears' single "...Baby One More Time" was keeping its top position. The single stayed on the Top 100 for 23 weeks and was Australia's the eighth-highest-selling single of 1999.

Track listings

 US CD and cassette single
 "That Don't Impress Me Much" (Remix #1) – 3:59
 "That Don't Impress Me Much" (Remix #2) – 3:40

 Australasian CD single
 "That Don't Impress Me Much" (dance mix) – 4:43
 "From This Moment On" (Tempo mix) – 4:03
 "From This Moment On" (dance mix) – 6:22
 "Honey, I'm Home" (live/direct TV mix) – 3:46

 Australasian maxi-CD single
 "That Don't Impress Me Much" (dance mix) – 4:43
 "(If You're Not in It for Love) I'm Outta Here!" (live/direct TV mix) – 7:03
 Medley:  (live/direct TV mix) – 7:25
 "Love Gets Me Every Time" (dance mix) – 4:42
 "Don't Be Stupid (You Know I Love You)" (extended dance mix) – 4:44

 European CD single and UK cassette single
 "That Don't Impress Me Much" (dance mix edit) – 3:59
 "From This Moment On" (Tempo mix) – 4:03

 European maxi-CD single
 "That Don't Impress Me Much" (dance mix edit) – 3:59
 "From This Moment On" (Tempo mix) – 4:03
 "From This Moment On" (dance mix) – 6:22
 "Honey, I'm Home" (live/direct TV mix) – 3:46

 UK CD1
 "That Don't Impress Me Much" (dance mix edit) – 3:59
 "From This Moment On" (Tempo mix) – 4:03
 "From This Moment On" (solo vocal/remix) – 3:46

 UK CD2
 "That Don't Impress Me Much" – 3:38
 "You're Still the One" – 3:34
 Medley:  (live/direct TV mix) – 7:25
 "That Don't Impress Me Much" (video)

 French CD single
 "That Don't Impress Me Much" (dance mix edit) – 3:59
 "Man! I Feel Like a Woman!" – 3:53

Credits and personnel
Credits are taken from the Come On Over album booklet.

Studio
 Recorded and mastered at Masterfonics (Nashville, Tennessee)

Personnel

 Shania Twain – writing, vocals, background vocals
 Robert John "Mutt" Lange – writing, background vocals, production
 Biff Watson – guitars
 Dann Huff – guitars, guitar textures, six-string bass, talk box
 Brent Mason – electric guitar and solo
 Paul Franklin – pedal steel guitar
 Joe Chemay – electric and fretless bass
 Paul Leim – drums
 Mike Shipley – mixing
 Olle Romo – programming, Pro Tools, sequencing, editing
 Glenn Meadows – mastering

Charts

Weekly charts

Year-end charts

Decade-end charts

Certifications

Release history

References

Shania Twain songs
1998 singles
1999 singles
1997 songs
2003 CONCACAF Gold Cup
CONCACAF Gold Cup official songs and anthems
APRA Award winners
Canadian Country Music Association Video of the Year videos
Irish Singles Chart number-one singles
Mercury Records singles
Music videos directed by Paul Boyd
Number-one singles in New Zealand
Number-one singles in Norway
Number-one singles in Scotland
Songs written by Robert John "Mutt" Lange
Song recordings produced by Robert John "Mutt" Lange
Songs written by Shania Twain
Ultratop 50 Singles (Flanders) number-one singles